Playford Road, located near Rushmere St Andrew, Ipswich is the training ground of Ipswich Town Football Club.

History 
Playford Road was officially opened in 2001. In addition to multiple pitches, the initial development of the training ground also included a dome housing an indoor pitch, with new buildings also being constructed including a canteen, players' lounge, parents' lounge, recreation room, classroom, changing rooms and office accommodation.

In 2018, a new state of the art gym was installed at Playford Road. Further development work was done during 2019, with new improvements made to the medical facilities, including the installation of a £90k recovery suite, £100k was also spent on installing new fencing around the complex, as well as general up keeping work.

Following the club's sale to US-based group Gamechanger 20 in April 2021, Playford Road also became property of the new owners. A small unused section of the ground remained under the ownership of Marcus Evans, where the EADT has reported he intends on building a new housing development.

Facilities 
The Playford Road complex includes a wide range of facilities for both the first-team and academy, including a gym, recovery suite, canteen, players' lounge, parents' lounge, recreation room, classroom, changing rooms and office accommodation. The training ground also includes 11 pitches of various specifications, including four full-size grass pitches,  four medium-size grass pitches, one medium-size floodlit grass pitch, one full-size floodlit artificial 3G pitch and one indoor medium-size artificial 3G pitch, located within the dome.

References 

Ipswich Town F.C.
Association football training grounds in England